This article lists the complete results of the group stage of the 2012 Uber Cup in Wuhan, China.

Group A

China vs. South Africa

Indonesia vs. South Africa

China vs. Indonesia

Group B

Chinese Taipei vs. Netherlands

Thailand vs. Netherlands

Chinese Taipei vs. Thailand

Group C

Korea vs. Australia

Germany vs. Australia

Korea vs. Germany

Group D

Japan vs. United States

Denmark vs. United States

Japan vs. Denmark

References

2012 Thomas & Uber Cup